This is an overview of Equinor's operations in various countries. Equinor is a Norwegian petroleum company.

Algeria
Equinor is a participant with British Petroleum and Sonatrach in two gas fields in Algeria; In Amenas and In Salah. It also operates the Hassi Mouina exploration block. Equinor's has offices in the capital Algiers.

Angola
Statoil has operational interests in four blocs (#4, #15, #17 and #31) in Angola. Statoil's Angola offices are located in the capital Luanda.

Azerbaijan
In Azerbaijan Equinor is a partner in the offshore development and exploration of the Azeri-Chirag-Guneshli project in the Caspian Sea. Equinor also has interests in the Baku-Tbilisi-Ceyhan oil pipeline, running from Baku to the port of Ceyhan in Turkey. Equinor's offices are located in the capital Baku. Equinor is a partner with SOCAR in the appraisal and development of the Karabagh oilfield and operator in the exploration of Ashrafi-Dan Ulduzu-Aypara (ADUA) area in the Caspian Sea.

Belgium
The receiving plant for the pipeline Zeepipe is located in Zeebrügge, Belgium while Statoil's offices are located in Mechelen, near Brussels.

Brazil
Statoil received in 2005 two deepwater block on the Brazilian continental shelf. Statoil's offices are located in Rio de Janeiro. Statoil and Petrobras have signed memorandum of understanding (MoU) to strengthening their cooperation in Brazil. The intention of the MoU is to evaluate joint participation in future tenders for exploration areas and to increase upstream collaboration in producing fields in the Santos and Campos offshore basins.

Canada
Statoil constructed the Leismer SAGD Facility in Alberta, Canada, and has operations on the Canadian East coast, offshore Newfoundland. In July 2017, Statoil announced that it had hit dry wells in a prospect in the Atlantic offshore Newfoundland. In 2016 Statoil sold the Leismer oil sand operation to Athabasca Oil. The cash and share sale was concluded in January 2017 for an estimated $800 million, thereby exiting the oil sands business "almost certainly".

China
In China Statoil is the operator of the Lufeng 22-1 oil field located in the South China Sea. Statoil's offices are located in Shekou.
The Lufeng 22-1 oilfield project is the first Chinese Offshore oilfield to be abandoned, shutting down officially on 16 June 2009.

Denmark
In addition to 261 service stations, 51 1-2-3 stations and a network of distribution of petroleum products in Denmark, Statoil also owns a refinery in Kalundborg and is performing exploration on the Faroe Islands continental shelf. Statoil's offices are located in Copenhagen.

Egypt
In February 2006 Statoil opened offices in the Egyptian capital of Cairo.

Estonia
In Estonia Statoil operates a number of service stations.

France
Gas to France is landed at Dunkerque through Franpipe. Norway is France' largest supplier of gas, and Statoil's offices are located in the capital of Paris.

Germany
In Germany Statoil operates the Etzel gas store and the Emden-Etzel transportation system. These include processing plants in Dornum, Emden and Etzel. Statoil's offices are located in Emden.

Iran
Statoil is part of the South Pars project in the Persian Gulf in Iran in addition to the fields Ahwaz, Marun and Bibi Hakimeh. Statoil's offices are located in the capital Teheran.

Ireland
Statoil own 36% of the Corrib gas field, off Ireland's west coast. Statoil has now sold its filling stations to Topaz Energy. A convenience store brand "FarePlay" was operated by Statoil, the worldwide rights to the FarePlay brand are now also owned by Topaz Energy.

Kazakhstan
Equinor has offices in the Kazakhstan capital of Nur-Sultan.

Latvia
Throughout Latvia Statoil operates a number of service stations. Statoil's office is located in the capital of Riga, and this office is responsible for the entire Latvian operations. Statoil is the largest operator in Latvia there are almost 80 service stations.

Libya
After establishing itself in Libya in 2005, Statoil has one fully owned exploration contract and one in partnership with British Gas.

The share in the Mabruk oil field, has been reduced to 5% (25% was owned before Libyan authorities ratified contracts in 2009 and 2010, according to B.G. Pedersen).

1.5 billion Norwegian kroner was its investment in Libya, and 1.5 billion was paid in Libyan taxes, between 2005 and 2010.

Statoil closed their Libya office (in Tripoli), in February 2011.

Lithuania
In Lithuania Statoil operates a chain of gas stations. Statoil's offices are located in Lithuania's capital Vilnius.

Mexico
After establishing itself with an office in Mexico in 2001, Statoil is looking into possible ventures along with the state-owned oil company Petroleos Mexicanos. Statoil's offices are located in the capital Mexico City.

Nigeria
With Chevron as partner, Statoil is operator of two off shore blocks (#128 and #129) and in partnership with Petrobras owns part of blocks #315 and #324 in Nigeria. Statoil's offices are located in Lagos.

Norway
Equinor is the largest operator on the Norwegian continental shelf, with 60% of total production. The fields operated are Glitne, Gullfaks, Heidrun, Huldra, Kristin, Kvitebjørn, Mikkel, Norne, Sleipner, Snorre, Snøhvit, Statfjord, Sygna, Tordis, Troll, Veslefrikk, Vigdis, Visund, Volve and Åsgard. Equinor also operates a chain of service stations and other energy related products. The company has processing plants at Kolsnes, Kårstø, Mongstad and Tjeldbergodden. The company's global headquarters are in Stavanger, and it has other offices around Norway.

Poland
In Poland Statoil operates 200 service stations. In addition there is exported gas to Poland from Norway. Statoil's offices are located in the capital Warszawa.

Qatar
Statoil opened an office in the Qatar capital of Doha in April 2005.

Russia
Statoil has a 24% stake in the Shtokman field located in the Barents Sea. Gazprom is the operator of this field and Total S.A. has a 25% share. Statoil also has six service stations in the Murmansk region. Statoil's offices are located in the capital Moscow. In March 2022 Equinor left Russian market because of International sanctions during the Russo-Ukrainian War.

Saudi Arabia
Statoil has since 2001 had offices in the Saudi Arabian capital of Riyadh.

Singapore
In Singapore Statoil has a sales office for crude oil, refined products and natural gas liquids.

Sweden
Statoil offers a number of different petroleum products in Sweden, including 600 service stations. Statoil's offices are located in the capital of Stockholm.

Turkey
The Baku-Tbilisi-Ceyhan pipeline terminates in Turkey and Statoil is building up a network for distribution of gas in Turkey. Statoil's offices are located in Istanbul.

United Arab Emirates
Since 2001 Statoil has had offices in Abu Dhabi, United Arab Emirates to explore possible business ventures in the country.

United Kingdom
In the United Kingdom Statoil participates in production on the UK continental shelf. In addition Statoil has a trading office for crude oil. Statoil's offices are located in the capital London.

United States
In 2005 Statoil ventured into deepwater oil production in the Gulf of Mexico.  In November 2008, Statoil paid $3.375 billion for a 32.5% interest in 1.8 million net acres of oil and gas leases in the Marcellus Shale gas trend in the Appalachian Basin. Statoil's production offices are located in Houston while a trading office for crude oil and refined products is located in Stamford, a suburb of New York City. In 2011, Statoil bought Brigham Exploration for $4.4 Billion to gain access to its oil shale operations in North Dakota's Bakken formation. An accountant report estimated that Equinor had lost NOK 200 billion on its US operations.

About 60-80 turbines are planned. In January 2021 BP acquired a 50% stakehold in the project. The project will support the development of manufacturing at the Port of Albany.

Venezuela
In Venezuela Statoil has received permission to perform explorations on block 4 of Plataforma Deltana. Statoil's offices are located in the capital Caracas.

References

Operations
Corporation-related lists